Eley is a surname and a given name. People with the name are as follows:

Surname
Brian Eley (born 1946), British chessplayer
Bridget Cracroft-Eley (1933–2008), British secretary and farmer and Lord Lieutenant of Lincolnshire
Bryan Eley (born 1939), British racewalker
Clifton Eley (born 1961), American football player
Dan Eley (1914–2015), British chemist and academic
Donald Hill-Eley, American football coach and former player
Sir Frederick Eley, 1st Baronet (1866–1951), English banker
Frederick Eley (architect) (1884–1979), American architect
Geoff Eley (born 1949), British-born historian of Germany
Geoffrey Eley (1904–1990), British banker
Gladys Pearl Baker Mortensen Eley (1902–1984), mother of American actress Marilyn Monroe
Jim Eley (1932–2014), Australian rules football player
Jon Eley (born 1984), British speed skater 
Maxwell Eley (1902–1983), British rower 
Monroe Eley, American football player
Robin Eley (born 1978), Australian painter
Stanley Eley (1904–1990), British Anglican bishop 
Thalia C. Eley, British academic and psychologist
William Eley, British football player

Given name
Eley Williams, British writer

See also
 Eley (disambiguation)

English-language surnames